This is a list of Asian Americans and Pacific Islands Americans in the U.S. Congress.

Asian Americans are Americans of Asian descent. The term refers to a panethnic group that includes diverse populations with ancestral origins in East Asia, South Asia or Southeast Asia, as defined by the U.S. Census Bureau.

Pacific Islands Americans, also known as Oceanian Americans, Pacific Islander Americans or Native Hawaiian and/or other Pacific Islander Americans, are Americans who have ethnic ancestry among the indigenous peoples of Oceania (viz. Polynesians, Melanesians and Micronesians). For its purposes, the U.S. Census also counts Indigenous Australians as part of this group.

As of February 2021, there are 15 representatives and 2 senators of Asian-American descent who are currently serving in Congress. In addition, there are one representative and three non-voting delegates of Pacific Islander descent who currently are also serving. Since 1900, 20 Pacific Islanders have been elected to the House of Representatives (17 of them as non-voting Resident Commissioners, Delegates or Resident Representatives) and one has been elected to the U.S. Senate. Hawaii was the first territory to send a Pacific Islander to the House of Representatives (in 1900) and was also the first state to send a Pacific Islander to the U.S. Senate (in 1990). Since 1957, 38 Asian Americans have been elected as U.S. Representatives and 9 as U.S. Senators. Hawaii was the first of four states to send an Asian American to the Senate (1959) and Illinois is the most recent state to elect a senator of similar descent for the first time (2016).  With respect to the House of Representatives, California was the first of 13 states to elect an Asian American to the House (1956), and New Jersey is the most recent to do so for the first time (2018). Three Asian-American women have been elected to the Senate (two of whom currently are incumbents and represent Hawaii and Illinois, respectively), and 13 have been elected to the House (eight of whom currently are incumbents) from six separate states.

Senate 
(Note: Senators are organized first in chronological order according to their first term in office, then second in alphabetical order according to their surname.)

House of Representatives 
(Note: Representatives are organized first in chronological order according to their first term in office, then second in alphabetical order according to their surname.)

House delegates (non-voting members) 
Resident Commissioners were House delegates from the Philippines, then an American territory. Two were elected at-large by the Philippine Legislature from 1907 to 1935, and, following the establishment of the Commonwealth of the Philippines, a single Resident Commissioner was appointed by the President of the Philippines (with the consent of the Commomwealth's Commission on Appointments) from 1936 to 1946.

From 1978 to 2009, the Northern Mariana Islands elected four Resident Representatives who had no privileges in the House. American Samoa similarly elected three Delegates at-large from 1971 to 1981 and Guam elected one Washington Representative from 1965 to 1973.

(Note: Delegates are organized first in chronological order according to their first term in office, then second in alphabetical order according to their surname.)

See also 
Congressional Asian Pacific American Caucus
List of Asian Australian politicians

Notes and references

Further reading 
 Tong, Lorraine H. (2003). "Asian Pacific Americans in the United States Congress". Congressional Research Service 97-398, 9–14.
, highlighting the role of the first woman of color and first female Asian-American to serve in Congress, Patsy Mink.

 
Asian
Asian members